Pétanque at the 2009 Asian Indoor Games was held in Từ Liêm Gymnasium, Hanoi, Vietnam from 4 November to 7 November 2009.

Medalists

Medal table

Results

Men's singles

Round 1
4 November

Knockout round
5 November

Men's doubles

Round 1
5–6 November

Knockout round
7 November

Women's singles

Round 1
4 November

Knockout round
5 November

Women's doubles

Round 1
5–6 November

Knockout round
7 November

References
 Official site

2009 Asian Indoor Games events
2009 in bowls
2009 Asian Indoor Games